Porkaalam is a 1997 Indian Tamil-language drama film written and directed by Cheran. The film has Murali, Meena, Sanghavi, Rajeshwari and Vadivelu in key roles. It was later remade in Telugu, Kannada and Hindi. Porkaalam was one among 1997 Deepavali releases and became a huge success.

Plot
The film deals with the social stigma associated with a disabled girl in a rural milieu. Manikkam (Murali) is a potter by profession. He has a sister, who is born dumb. Murali has to struggle a lot as the handicraft industry is a dying industry and a good amount of money is taken away by his father (Manivannan), who is a drunkard and a gambler. But, he tries to hide his sorrows by having fun with his sister and servant (Vadivelu), who is also his trusted friend. He is in love with his neighbour Maragatham (Meena), a weaver. He wants to get his sister married to a noble man. But many reject her as she is dumb. Finally, one man agrees to marry his sister but on condition that Manikkam must offer dowry. Manikkam then sells many things dearer to him to get money for the dowry. But, that money is taken away by his father and the marriage falls through. Yet (Vadivelu) offers to marry his sister without asking dowry and Murali goes home along with Vadivelu to convey this happy news to his sister. But it was too late as the sister commits suicide. Manikkam as a penance decides to marry a disabled girl.

Cast

Soundtrack
The soundtrack album and background score were composed by Deva. The lyrics were penned by Vairamuthu.

Track list

Reception 
Krishna Sivarampuram of Indolink said, "... very few have the ability to make the viewers think... And only two or three have the rare ability to combine a good comedy line with a tear-jerker...Cheran seems to have revived this genre of film making".
Arunachalam movie 100th day function 'superstar' Rajinikanth praised well this movie and he appreciated gifted a gold chain to director Cheran. Ji of Kalki wrote .

Remakes

Awards
 Cheran won Tamil Nadu State Film Award for Best Director
 Meena won Tamil Nadu State Film Award for Best Actress

References

External links
 

1997 films
Films directed by Cheran
Tamil films remade in other languages
1990s Tamil-language films
Films about disability in India
Films scored by Deva (composer)